Lakunai Airfield, later known as Rabaul Airport; was an aerodrome located near Rabaul, East New Britain, Papua New Guinea. It was located at the foot of Tavurvur volcano, near Matupit Island. The airport was destroyed by the 1994 eruption that destroyed the town of Rabaul and subsequently a new airport was built and opened at Tokua, on the opposite side of the Rabaul caldera.

World War II 
The airfield was constructed by the Royal Australian Air Force as an emergency landing strip for Vunakanau Airfield and consisted of an unpaved 4,700 foot single runway during World War II. The airfield was captured during the battle of Rabaul in 1942 by the Imperial Japanese and was extensively modified and expanded. Lakunai was later neutralized by Allied air bombing from 1944.

Allied Units based at Lakunai Airfield
No. 8 Squadron RAAF, Bristol Beaufort (1945)

Japanese Units based at Lakunai Airfield
Chitose Kōkūtai (A5M Claude)
4th Kōkūtai  (A5M Claude & A6M Zero) - February 10, 1942
Tainan Kōkūtai (A6M Zero)
6th Kōkūtai (A6M Zero)
501st Kōkūtai (D4Y Judy)
11th Sentai (Ki-43 Oscar)
1st Sentai (Ki-43 Oscar)
68th Sentai (Ki-61 Tony)
78th Sentai (Ki-61 Tony)
81st Sentai (Ki-46 Dinah and Ki-21 Sally)

Post-War and Subsequent Destruction 
After World War II, it was used as a civilian airport until 1994, when a Volcanic eruption occurred at Tavurvur volcano at which the airport was located at. The airport was covered in ash and destroyed, this led to a new airport being built for Rabaul.

Notes

References

External links
http://www.pacificwrecks.com/airfields/png/lakunai/index.html
 LAKUNAI AIRPORT RABAUL 

Transport in Papua New Guinea
Defunct airports in Papua New Guinea
Airports in Papua New Guinea
East New Britain Province